Southern Cross Route is a term for passenger flights from Australasia (or Oceania) to Europe via the Western Hemisphere. The term was coined by British Commonwealth Pacific Airlines when they began services from Sydney to Vancouver in 1949. The route was extended to Europe following the signing of an air services agreement between Australia and the United Kingdom in 1957, which saw Qantas flying from Sydney to London via Los Angeles and New York using Lockheed L-1049 Super Constellations. The name is in honor of Sir Charles Kingsford Smith's historic 1928 flight in the aircraft Southern Cross. The equivalent route running through the Eastern Hemisphere is known as the Kangaroo Route.

Qantas operated on the route from 1949 — 1974, when it discontinued the London leg of the trip. BOAC began flying to Australia via the South Pacific in April 1967. Air New Zealand operated an Auckland–Los Angeles–London Heathrow from 1982 — 2020. Other airlines to use the route include Air Tahiti Nui, French Bee, Air France, Air Canada, Aerolíneas Argentinas, and LAN Airlines.

Operations
Aside from codeshares and alliances/partners, airlines on the Southern Cross Route (with seasonal destinations in italics) are the following:

See also
Kangaroo Route – the Southern Cross Route's counterpart travelling via the Eastern Hemisphere
Wallaby Route - Qantas' route launched in 1952 connecting Sydney to Johannesburg, South Africa by many "little hops" via Melbourne, Perth, The Cocos Islands, and Mauritius.
Fiesta Route - Qantas' route that existed from 1964-1975 connecting Sydney to London via Fiji, Tahiti, Acapulco, Mexico City, The Bahamas, and Bermuda.

References

Airline routes
Aviation in Australia
Aviation in New Zealand
Aviation in French Polynesia
Aviation in the United States
Qantas
Aviation in Chile